Haggard is a German symphonic metal band founded in 1989. The group combines classical music and early music with death doom metal.

History

Haggard was founded in 1989 and originally played death metal. They changed their musical style after their first demo tape, Introduction in 1992, becoming a band with symphonic melodies and classical instruments but folk themes. The album And Thou Shalt Trust... the Seer marked their breakthrough in 1997. After their second album Awaking the Centuries (the life of the prophet Nostradamus), they toured through Mexico twice. In 2004, they released their third album Eppur Si Muove which is about the life of Italian scholar Galileo Galilei, sentenced to house arrest for heresy by the Catholic Church for supporting Copernicus' claim that the Earth revolved around the sun.

Just before their album Awaking the Centuries was released, the group had its highest number of musicians at 21. All their songs are written by vocalist and guitarist Asis Nasseri.

The fourth album, Tales of Ithiria, was released in 2008 and is based on a fantasy story.

In 2010, the band had its first concert along with a symphonic orchestra. Haggard played together with the philharmonic orchestra of Plovdiv in the Bulgarian city of Plovdiv on 19 April 2010.

Although a new album with the title of Grimm was originally announced for the end of 2012, the album has since been postponed indefinitely.

Discography

Demos
 Introduction  (1992)
 Progressive (1994)
 Once... Upon a December's Dawn (1995)

Studio albums

Live
 Awaking the Gods: Live in Mexico (2001)

DVDs and videos
 In a Pale Moon's Shadow (1998)
 Awaking the Gods: Live in Mexico (DVD/VHS) (2001)

Members

Current members
 Asis Nasseri – vocals, guitar (1991–present)
 Giacomo Astorri – bass
 Janika Groß – soprano
 Frank Schumacher – tenor vocals
 Claudio Quarta – guitar
 Aline Deinert – violin
 Ivica Kramheller – double bass 
 Lisa Hellmich – viola
 Anne Eberlein – viola
 Cosmin Nechita – violin
 Johannes Schleiermacher – violoncello (cello)
 Florinda Hoffmann – violoncello (cello)
 Hans Wolf – piano, keyboards, organ, harpsichord
 Ingrid Nietzer – piano, keyboards
 Maurizio Guolo – drums, percussion (2012–present)
 Stefana Sabau – oboe
 Catalina Popa – flute
Veronika Kramheller - soprano 
Michel Schumm - drums, percussion 
Michel Stapf - violin

Past members

 Florian Bartl – oboe, English horn
 Judith Marschall – violin
 Fiffi Fuhrmann – tenor vocals, bass
 Dorothea Zelinsky – violin
 Mark Pendry – clarinet
 Sasema – vocals
 Gaby Koss – soprano vocals
 Robert von Greding – clarinet
 Christoph von Zastrow – flute
 Danny Klupp – guitar
 Kathrin Pechlof – harp
 Karin Bodemüller – vocals
 Florian Schnellinger – percussion
 Andi Nad – bass
 Robin Fischer – bass
 Andi Hemberger – vocals
 Kathrin Hertz – cello
 Andreas Peschke – flute
 Manuela Kraller – soprano vocals
 Susanne Ehlers – soprano vocals
 Veronika Kramheller – soprano vocals
 Jonathan Whynot – guitar
 Michael Stapf – violin
 Andreas Fuchs – horn – percussion
 Linda Antonetti – oboe
 Steffi Hertz – viola
 Patrizia Krug – cello
 Luz Marsen – drum
 Michael Schumm – classical percussion – drum
 Ally Storch-Hukriede – violin

In addition to the 16 band members, more than 10 guest artists and musicians were involved in the making of the album Eppur Si Muove.

References

External links

 
 

German doom metal musical groups
German symphonic metal musical groups
Musical groups established in 1989
German death metal musical groups
German heavy metal musical groups